The 1989 Women's World Snooker Championship was a women's snooker tournament that took place from 14 to 21 October 1989. It was the 1989 edition of the World Women's Snooker Championship, first held in 1976. The event was held at the Pontins resort in Brixham.

The tournament was won by defending champion Allison Fisher, who defeated Ann-Marie Farren 6–5 in the final and received £3,500 prize money. This was Fisher's fourth world snooker title in five years, and she would go on to win a total of seven championships before focusing her efforts on pool in the United States from 1995.

Main draw

References 

1989 in English sport
1989 in snooker
1989 in women's sport
October 1989 sports events in the United Kingdom
International sports competitions hosted by England
1989